Çampınar  (formerly Kahdama) is a village in Mut district of Mersin Province, Turkey, to the northwest of Mut. Population of Çampınar  was 295 as of 2012.

References

Villages in Mut District